Dazzle may refer to:

 Glare (vision), difficulty seeing in the presence of bright light
 Dazzle (fabric), a type of polyester fabric
 Dazzle (manga), a Japanese manga series by Minari Endoh
 "Dazzle" (song), a song by Siouxsie & the Banshees
 Dazzle (video recorder), a video capture card
 Dazzle camouflage, a paint scheme used on ships during World War I
 Dazzle, an American disco act featuring Leroy Burgess
 Dazzle, a 1990 novel by Judith Krantz
 Dazzle, a 1995 TV miniseries adaptation of Krantz's novel starring Lisa Hartman
 Dazzle, a 2009 film by Cyrus Frisch

See also
 Dazzler (disambiguation)
 The Dazzle Dancers, an American performance group
 Dazzle Ships (album), a 1983 album by Orchestral Manoeuvres in the Dark